Cassata Catholic High School is a private, Catholic high school in Fort Worth, Texas.  It is located in the Catholic Diocese of Fort Worth.

Background
Cassata was established in 1975 as an alternative school for students who did not respond to a traditional educational environment. It is named after John Joseph Cassata. To date, more than 3,500 students have graduated from Cassata Catholic High School. The school is accredited by the Southern Association of Colleges and Schools (SACS) and the Texas Catholic Conference (TCC).

External links
 School website

Notes and references

Catholic secondary schools in Texas
Educational institutions established in 1975
Private high schools in Fort Worth, Texas
High schools in Tarrant County, Texas
Alternative schools in the United States